The Heqanakht papyri or Heqanakht letters (also spelled Hekanakht) are a group of papyri dating to the early Middle Kingdom of Ancient Egypt that were found in the tomb complex of Vizier Ipi. Their find was located in the burial chamber of a servant named Meseh, which was to the right side of the courtyard of Ipi's burial complex. It is believed that the papyri were accidentally mixed into debris used to form a ramp to push the coffin of Meseh into the chamber. The papyri contain letters and accounts written by (or on behalf of) Heqanakht, a ka-priest of Ipi. Heqanakht himself was obliged to stay in the Theban area (probably because of his responsibilities in the necropolis), and thus wrote letters to his family, probably located somewhere near the capital of Egypt at that time, near the Faiyum. These letters and accounts were somehow lost and thus preserved. The significance of the papers is that they give rare and valuable information about lives of ordinary members of the lower upper class of Egypt during this period.

Scholarship 
These papyri have been published and discussed several times. Cerny and Baer dwelt on economic and social issues, relating to land tenure, land ownership, monetary units and similar topics. Silver discussed macro and micro aspects of the commodity wages paid to estate workers, and other commodity monetary transactions cited in the Heqanakht papers. James and Allen prepared complete translations with commentaries, while Wente offered translations. The materials allowed people to understand both domestic squabbles and household management during that time.

Significance 
In the monetary system at the time of the papyri's creation, rent and taxes were generally (but not invariably) paid to Pharaoh in grain. For example, the text reports:
 

In terms of the understanding of what one would call "money," Heqanakht clearly calculated values in grain (particularly barley). However, he was able to convert this without difficulties into equivalent values in oil, textiles or copper. He both expected and offered payments in different commodities. For general purposes, however, he only valued new barley himself and was perfectly willing to put his family on short rations in the hope of profit (as Baer noted). On the other hand, however, once a temporary shortage was overcome, he did not view the grain as being particularly valuable: its use value was nil when the family was fed and its exchange value did not exist when his family needed to be fed.

For example: "Record of the household's incomes: Ipi (jpj) and her servant woman 8 (heqat), Hetepet (Htp.t) and her servant woman 8 (heqat), Heti's (Ht) son Nakht (nxt) together with his dependants 8 (heqat),  Merisu (mr.sw) and his dependants 8 (heqat), Sahathor (zA-Hwt-Hr) 8 (heqat), Sanebnut (ZA-nb-n'.t) 7 (heqat), Anpu (jnp) 4 (heqat), Snefru (snfr.w) 4 (heqat), Sa-inut (zA-jnw.t) 4 (heqat), Mai-sa-hetepet (may-zA-Htp.t) 5 (heqat),  Nofret (nfr.t) 3½ (heqat), Satwerut (zA.t-wr.wt) (?) 2 (heqat): Total 79½ (heqat)").

The papyri are also significant to the study of ancient economic thought, accountancy, and the history of Egyptian fractions and Egyptian multiplication and division. The Akhmim Wooden Tablet, the Egyptian Mathematical Leather Roll, the RMP 2/n table, the Rhind Mathematical Papyrus, the Ebers Papyrus and other mathematical texts reported expected and observed Egyptian fractions totals. Totals were written in quotients and scaled/unscaled remainder units. A meta context of the Egyptian Middle Kingdom weights and measures system had empowered one of the earliest Ancient Near East monetary systems. The Egyptian economy was able to double-check its management elements by using double entry accounting, and theoretical or abstract weights and measures units.

See also
 List of ancient Egyptian papyri

References

External links
https://web.archive.org/web/20161214193132/http://www.reshafim.org.il/ad/egypt/texts/heqanakht.htm, the text
Wiley Interscience Mahmoud Ezzamel
https://web.archive.org/web/20100117021426/http://ahmespapyrus.blogspot.com/2009/01/ahmes-papyrus-new-and-old.html Ahmes Papyrus, Updated
https://web.archive.org/web/20090215190603/http://planetmath.org/encyclopedia/AhmesBirdFeedingRateMethod.html, Ahmes' inventory control method
http://members.tripod.com/~sondmor/index-24.html, was Greek coinage first?
http://www.amazon.com/Economic-Structures-of-Antiquity/dp/B000PY3KRQ, earlier uses of weighed metals as money
http://www.math.buffalo.edu/mad/Ancient-Africa/mad_ancient_egypt_zero.html, nfr (Egyptian zero)
https://web.archive.org/web/20100330154519/http://www.egyptologyonline.com/Medicine.htm, list of medical texts

Egyptian papyri